Letsile Tebogo (born 7 June 2003) is a Botswana sprinter. He won the gold medal in the 100 metres and a silver in the 200 metres at both the 2021 and 2022 World Athletics Under-20 Championships. In 2021, Tebogo became the first Botswana athlete to take the 100 m title at the World Championship level. He is the 200 m 2022 African champion, becoming the youngest winner of this title in competition history.

Tebogo holds current world U20 and Botswana national record in the 100 m. He was the first man from Botswana to break 10 seconds at the event.

Career
On 19 February 2022, Letsile Tebogo set a new national record in the 100 metres at the Botswana Athletics Championships with a time of 10.08 seconds. Two months later, he became the first man from Botswana to break 10 seconds at the event as he clocked a time of 9.96 seconds at the Gaborone International Meet, setting a new world under-20 record. On 15 July, he further improved his record in his debut race at the World Athletics Championships held in Eugene, Oregon with a time of 9.94 seconds. The following month, Tebogo broke his own record again, clocking a 9.91 second performance in the final of the World Athletics U20 Championships in Cali, Colombia. At the end of the race he celebrated early, drawing comparisons to 100 m and 200 m world records holder Usain Bolt.

Personal bests
 100 metres: 9.91 (+0.8 m/s, Cali, 2 August 2022)  
 200 metres: 19.96 (-1.0 m/s, Cali, 4 August 2022)

See also
 List of Batswana records in athletics

References

External links
 

2003 births
Living people
Place of birth missing (living people)
Botswana male sprinters
World Athletics U20 Championships winners
People from Kanye, Botswana
African Championships in Athletics winners